Taconic Investment Partners is a real estate developer in New York City.  They have been involved in projects such as Essex Crossing, American Bank Note Company Printing Plant, 111 Eighth Avenue (where they have their offices) and Coney Island.

Taconic was formed in 1998 by Charles R. Bendit and Paul E. Pariser.  111 Eighth Avenue was one of their first investments  The firm became well known when they sold the building to Google for $2 billion in 2010.

Project 
Taconic Investment Partners introduced proposals in Midtown in 2020 for this nearly 295,000-square-foot building. The mixed-use structure, with 321 housing units spanning 270,000 square feet and 25,000 square feet of industrial space, will rise 32 floors tall.

References

External links
Corporate website

Real estate companies of the United States
1998 establishments in New York City